Hubert Pierre Déquier (born Saint-Jean-de-Maurienne, 6 November 1952) is a French poet and writer, best known as the author of the collection of poems La revolte d'un Montagnard ("The revolt of a mountain dweller") in  2011 . The book won the Epic Poetry Prize - Literary festival Hermillon, 2011. Since 2008, he has been a member of the Académie de Maurienne.

Bibliography

References

1952 births
French poets
Living people
French male poets